Dragnet may refer to:

 Dragnet, a fishing net used in seine fishing
 Dragnet (policing), a coordinated search, named for the fishing net

Media
 Dragnet (franchise)
 Dragnet (radio series), a 1949–1957 American radio series starring Jack Webb
 Dragnet (1951 TV series), the 1951–1959 American television spinoff from the radio series
 Dragnet (1954 film), a film version of the television and radio series starring and directed by Jack Webb
 Dragnet (1967 TV series), the 1967–1970 revival of the original television series
 Dragnet (1987 film), a parody of the television series starring Dan Aykroyd and Tom Hanks
 Dragnet, also known as The New Dragnet, see Dragnet (franchise)#1989 series: The New Dragnet
 Dragnet (2003 TV series), also known as L.A. Dragnet, see Dragnet (franchise)#2003 series: L.A. Dragnet
 "Dragnet" (theme music), from the various series
 The Drag Net, a 1928 American silent film
 Dragnet (1947 film), a 1947 American film starring Henry Wilco
 Dragnet (album), by The Fall
 "Dragnet", a poem by Patti Smith in Witt